Khoshab County is in Razavi Khorasan province, Iran. The capital of the county is the city of Soltanbad. At the 2006 census, the region's population (as Khoshab District of Sabzevar County) was 37,600 in 9,944 households. The following census in 2011 counted 37,914 people in 10,989 households, by which time the district had been separated from the county to form Khoshab County. At the 2016 census, the county's population was 37,181 in 11,883 households.

Administrative divisions

The population history and structural changes of Khoshab County's administrative divisions over three consecutive censuses are shown in the following table. The latest census shows two districts, five rural districts, and one city.

References

 

Counties of Razavi Khorasan Province